John Wesley Jones is the name of 

 John Wesley Jones (ambassador) (1907–1998), US Foreign Service officer, United States Ambassador to Libya (1958–1962)
 Johnny "Lam" Jones (1958–2019), American sprinter and football player

See also
John Jones (disambiguation)